The Mendota Beacon was a free, privately funded biweekly (and later, weekly) published newspaper in Madison, Wisconsin between 2005 and 2007.  It was formed in 2004 as a conservative alternative to the left-of-center The Badger Herald, The Daily Cardinal, and The Madison Observer that are distributed throughout the UW–Madison campus and downtown area. The name came from the fact that the campus is on the shore of Lake Mendota. The newspaper's motto was "Shining the Light on What's Right."

Funding 
The paper received its start-up capital from the conservative Leadership Institute, a 501(c)(3) non-profit organization located in Arlington, Virginia that teaches "political technology". Its first issue was on February 12, 2005.

Editorial point of view 
Many of the op-eds run in the Beacon addressed the issue of being conservative in Madison, a city that has a history of being a liberal hotbed.

The editorial writers also addressed issues of national and international concern.  
 The March 10, 2005 issue expressed an opinion that people such as John Kerry are frustrating because they take the "nonexistent 'middle ground'" on abortion.  By this they meant that Kerry, et al., who claim to be personally against abortion yet do not want to impose their beliefs on others, are guilty of "abortion hypocrisy."
 Another op-ed in the Beacon's first issue defended America's unilateralist policies by saying "There is now a faction in American politics that is willing to disregard our national sovereignty and take orders from an international organization. (the UN)".

Staff
Founders of The Beacon included Tim Shea, Robert Thelen III, Bradley Vogel, Jordan Smith, Steven Schwerbel and Darryn Beckstrom.

In early 2006, Vogel and Schwerbel left The Beacon to join The Herald as an at-large member of the editorial board and a columnist, respectively.

Thelen was part of a feature article in Madison's independent weekly newspaper, Isthmus. The article was a point/counterpoint article about the Iraq war. Thelen's portion of the debate explained his support for the war and for the Bush administration.

In November 2005, competing progressive paper, The Madison Observer, accused the Beacon of cybersquatting madisonobserver.com and .net and redirecting web users to the Mendota Beacon's web page or a vandalized version of the Madison Observer page instead of www.madisonobserver.org.  At the time, the ideologically opposite papers both claimed bi-weekly circulation of 5000.

See also

 The Michigan Review

References

Biweekly newspapers published in the United States
University of Wisconsin–Madison
Student newspapers published in Wisconsin